Laouni Mouhid (born 25 December 1981), commonly known by his stage name La Fouine, with additional aliases such as Fouiny Babe or just Fouiny, is a French rapper and singer of Moroccan descent. He is owner of Banlieue Sale and clothing line "Street Swagg".

Personal life 

Born in Trappes in a family of seven children to Moroccan parents from Casablanca, Laouni grew outside Paris in the Yvelines. His mother was so poor, they had to frequent the Restaurants du Cœur charity eateries. He is the penultimate of his six brothers and sisters, Hakim (aka the rapper Canardo), Kamel, Illham, Samira, Naima and Adil. La Fouine talked about this in "Je regarde là-haut".

He left school at the age of fifteen to devote himself to rap and took his first music lessons. La Fouine, who was called "Forcené" was an active member of the collective "GSP". It was part of the short-lived group "FORS" with DJ RV (Hervé), Le Griffon (Tarek Medimegh) And  LaylaD (Layla Melloni Forcé), created mainly to participate at 2 R puissance ART in La Verrière, where he won the second prize.

In 1998, La Fouine was imprisoned. Since then, Laouni married, then divorced after becoming the father of a little girl, born in 2002, named Fatima, named after La Fouine's mother. His mother's death in 2005 inspired his song "Je regarde là-haut" He also experienced dark periods in foster homes and prisons. "I was only fifteen when I was expelled from school and placed in foster homes. I became an insomniac for most of the time. But it did not take me to sleep with me, if the cops were looking for me directly. I slept with people in cars, premises, etc.. It was misery", he said to the magazine Planète Rap.

La Fouine is a fan of amateur club ESA Linas-Montlhéry.

Career

2005: Bourré au Son 
After releasing his first street-tape Planète Trappes that made him earn an early legitimacy in rap, he released his first album in 2005 called Bourré au Son strongly marked by the California style. The singles "L'unité" and "Quelque chose de spécial" meet critical acclaim and broadcast on many French radio stations.

2007: Aller-Retour 
After putting out Planète  Trappes Volume 2 on the market launching especially his brother Canardo through three titles, La Fouine released his second album entitled Aller-Retour on 12 March 2007. The first single from this album was "Reste en Chien" with Booba. The second single was titled "Qui peut me stopper", "Banlieue Sale" with Gued'1 & Kennedy and "Tombé pour elle" with Amel Bent. Today, this album is certified gold.

2009: Mes Repères 
After releasing the street-tape Capitale du Crime which highlights the rappers of Yvelines, the third album of the rapper Mes Repères released in February 2009 and received a gold disc certification in October 2009. It included three guest appearances especially with Soprano on "Repartir à zéro" and still with Soprano and Sefyu on "Ca fait mal (Remix)" and Canardo (his younger brother) on "Hamdoulah Moi Ca Va". Today, this album is certified platinum.

2010: Capitale du Crime Volume 2 
The disk Capitale du Crime Volume 2 released on 18 January 2010, ranks third in the album sales in France in the first week of its release. On this album are collaborations with Canardo, Green Money, Kennedy, Vincenzo, Chabodo, A2P Rickwell, Gued'1...

In April 2010, La Fouine worked with Admiral T & Medine on the piece "Viser la Victoire", extract the Admiral-T's album entitled L'Instinct Admiral and so on Street Lourd II with the song "Dans nos quartiers" in collaboration with Alonzo and Teddy Corrona. Nowadays, this mixtape is certified gold.

2011: La Fouine vs Laouni 

The first single from her double album La Fouine vs Laouni is "Passe-leur le salam" featuring Rohff. "Veni, vidi, vici" is the second single and the third extract "Caillera for Life" is a collaboration with California rapper The Game in which The Game tried performing in French. And the fourth from the album entitled "Papa" is a track where La Fouine speaks about his father. The fifth single was released on 21 January 2011 called "Les Soleils de Minuits".

La Fouine revealed the list of titles, but also the production of the album on 21 January 2011. The music is especially tracks with Street Fabulous, Animalsons, Dj E-Rise Skalp, etc.,  while his brother Canardo appears on the microphone on "Bafana Bafana (Remix)".

On 7 May 2011, La Fouine had a concert at the Zenith in Paris, That evening, he performed with Zaho the title "Quand ils vont partir". Moreover, some time after, Kamelancien signed with the label of La Fouine's managers "S-Kal Records". Other notable rappers followed such as Sultan.

La Fouine released a reissue of the album on 15 June 2011. While waiting his new mixtape Capital Crime Vol. III, La Fouine released a new edition of La Fouine vs Laouni entitled La Fouine et Laouni including twelve songs of his double album with an unpublished remix "Toute la night" produced by Majestic Drama and "Veni, vidi, vici" remixed by Dj Battle featuring Francisco. Today, this album is certified platinum.

2012: Capitale du Crime Volume 3 
Capitale du Crime Volume 3 was released on 28 November 2011. It contained many guest appearances with American stars such as T-Pain on "Rollin' Like a Boss", DJ Khaled at production on "VNTM.com" and Ace Hood on "T'es mort dans le film". The mixtape sold over 62,000 copies until March 2012 and was certified gold. Meanwhile, he joined the group Trappes Stars created by his former manager Bodé. Trappes Stars was composed of some rappers of Trappes region such as Canardo, Green, MAS, Chabodo, Gued'1 or the A2P. All gathered on a compilation mixed by DJ Battle.

2013: Drôle de Parcours 
On 10 September 2012, La Fouine revealed on social networks the title of his new album entitled Drôle de Parcours. The first single from the album was "Paname Boss" and released on 2 November 2012. This single featured Sniper, Niro, Youssoupha, Canardo, Fababy and Sultan. 6 November 2012, La Fouine released the second single from Drôle de Parcours called "J'avais pas les mots". The third single is "Ma Meilleure" in featuring Zaho. 60,000 copies of the album were sold and the album was certified gold.

2014: Team BS 

Team BS is a project and a hip hop collective of La Fouine launched in 2013, and an initiative of his record label Banlieue Sale, "BS" denoting actually the record label they work in. Collective Team BS is a collaboration of Banlieue Sale acts La Fouine, Fababy, Sultan and the vocalist Sindy the latter from the French television series Popstars where la Fouine was one of the judges. Also included in the collective is the French producer Pascal Lemaire known as DJ Skalp / Skalpovich.

In 2013, the collective Team BS had a debuting charting success with the self-titled single "Team BS" (alternatively known as "Vrai frères"). The release was accompanied by a music video. In January 2014, Team BS came up with a follow-up single "Case départ". It is working on an album to be released in 2014 under the title Les affaires commencent.

Clashes

With Kamelancien 
Early 2005, La Fouine responded with his title "Ferme ta gueule" to Kamelancien who attacked him as "twisted face" in the song "Reste vrai". Kamelancien soon turned up with his new response titled "Crise Cardiaque" and openly threatened him on a TV programme. This clash between the two Moroccan rappers, was a sort of clash with completely different style, one from Oujda and representing the Val-de-Marne and the other a native of Casablanca, representing the Yvelines. In 2011 the two rappers were reconciled and performed the song "Vécu" seen over 16 million times on YouTube. In May 2011, La Fouine invited Kamelancien to his concert at the Zenith in Paris to officially end their clash.

With Booba 
Attacked by Booba, during the promotion of his album Futur according to him La Fouine "clashed" him on "Paname Boss" with a punchline. While his album had been released quite a few months, Booba insisted on releasing the song "AC Milan", where he attacked La Fouine calling him a pedophile, calling Emile Louis Laounizi (referring to Emile Louis) and diffusing an extract of a video where the criminal record of La Fouine is revealed.

La Fouine chose "Autopsie 5" to answer back (Autopsie is the name of mixtapes series of Booba). He chose to offer free the song explaining he did not want to make money on the clash. Thereafter, La Fouine and Booba released at the same time a second song "TLT" ("Tuez Les Tous" for Booba and "T'as La Tremblotte" for La Fouine) on their respective YouTube channels. La Fouine spoke mostly about Booba's photo that had circulated on the Internet, in parodying his music.

On 10 March 2013, Booba broadcast the video of their altercation that took place in Miami. American rapper 50 Cent put the video on his website. La Fouine replied "LOL! I just learned that the uncensored version of the altercation with b2obeatrice runs on the Net, I'll wait to find it to put the video of the altercation between him, Dixon (a friend of La Fouine) and Booba on Facebook. He highlighted passages that had been edited out by Booba where he runs away to escape La Fouine and Dixon. They nicknamed him Usain B2olt referring to Jamaican sprinter Usain Bolt.

Banlieue Sale 

In 2008, La Fouine and his brother Canardo decided to launch their own label called "Banlieue Sale". This independent label, forged a partnership with Sony-BMG, one of the biggest music labels in the world. Banlieue Sale has subsidiaries that are "S-Kal Records" (created by the managers of La Fouine) and "Henijai Music" (created by Canardo).

In sum, a half-dozen artists have signed on Banlieue Sale including:
Green
MLC
Chabodo
M.A.S
Evaanz
Fababy
Sindy

Discography

Albums and mixtapes 
( (A) denotes album, (M) denotes mixtape)

EP 
1999: Gloire et Misère 1
1999: Gloire et Misère 2
2000: Tous Les Mêmes Choses
2001: Gloire et Misère 3
2001: J'avance
2004: Boum Boum Boum (with Mala)

Singles 
(Charting)

(Promotional)

Featured in

Singles per album

Other singles 
Manque d'argent (2004)
3 gars au ghetto (2004)
Mon Autobiographie (2004)
Quelque chose de Spécial (2004)
L'unité Feat Jmi Sissoko (2004)
Peu à l'arrivée (2004)
Reste en chien Feat Booba (2007)
Qui peut me stopper ? (2007)
Banlieue sale (2007)
On s'en bat les couilles (2007)
Tombé pour elle (featuring Amel Bent) (2007)
Drôle de parcours (2007)
Cherche la monnaie (2008)
Ca fait mal (featuring Soprano et Sefyu ; remix by DJ Battle) (2008)
Tous les mêmes (2009)
Du Ferme (2009)
Hamdoulah moi ça va (featuring Canardo) (2009)
Chips (2009)
Krav Maga (2009)
Banlieue sale music (featuring Nessbeal) (2009)
La3bine (featuring Don Bigg) (2009)
Nés Pour briller (featuringCanardo, Green, MLC) (2010)
Pleure pas (featuring Green, Canardo et Kennedy (2010)
Viser La Victoire (Feat Admiral T & Medine (2010)
Passe leur le Salam (featuring Rohff (15 November 2010)
Veni Vidi Vici (2010)
Caillra For Life (2010) (featuring Game) (15 December 2010)
Papa (23 December 2010)
Les Soleils de minuit (2011)
Toute la night (2011)
Vntm.com (2011) (featuring DJ Khaled)
Vécu (2011) (featuring Kamelancien)
Des Pères, des Hommes et des Frères (2011) (Corneille featuring La Fouine)

Appearances 

2000 :
 La Fouine : Ma Génération extract from Rap.com

2001 :
 La Fouine featuring MC Circulaire: Façon Fouiskin

2002 :
 La Fouine : Freestyle extract from Violences Urbaines of LIM)
 Alibi Montana feat La Fouine : C'est Pour Les Mecs D'en Bas extract from Mandat de dêpot of Alibi Montana

2003 :
 La Fouine : Staarflah la famille extract from Talents fâchés
 La Fouine : Mon autobiographie  extract fromMa Zone of Mala
 La Fouine : 3 gars au ghetto  'extract from 109 Rap & R&B
 La Fouine : Manque d'argent extract from 109 Rap & R&B
 La Fouine : G des tassesextract from 109 Rap & R&B

2004 :
 La Fouine featuring Shyd-D : For my J's extract from 92100% Hip Hop Vol.4
 La Fouine & Mala : Boum Boum Boum (EP)

2005 :
 La Fouine : C'est pour les mecs d'en bas  extract fromWest Rider 2
 Willy Denzey feat la Fouine : Life  extract from#1 of Willy Denzey
 La Fouine featuring Pat Seb – Let's shake the towels

2006 :
 La Fouine :  Il en faut  extract from Talents Fâchés 3
 La Fouine featuring Jazz Malone : Non-Stop  extract from Paname All Stars
 La Fouine : Les barreaux extract from Phonographe
 Chabodo feat La Fouine & Jazz Malone : Levez haut les drapeaux extract from La Délinquance of Chabodo
 La Fouine featuring 2g68 :  Koma Etilik 
 La Fouine Feat S.Kro & Mc Gam'1 : Luxembourg City

2007 :
 Bibo feat La Fouine : Vie and Drop La Fouine extract from Volume Rose
 Manu Key featuring La Fouine : Responsable extract from Prolifique Vol.2
 Al Peco featuring La Fouine – Apparitions
 Phil G Unit featuring La Fouine : Talents Gâchés
 La Toxine featuring La Fouine : J'ai de l'amour pour mes caillesextract from Hi-One 1er Opus
 Matchstik featuring La Fouine : Dignity extract from Shock Therapy of Matchstick and "Capitale du Crime" of La Fouine
 La Fouine featuring Comma Comma : Luxembourg Freestyle Shop (Promo)
 La Fouine featuring Booba : Reste en chien extract from Aller-Retour
 La Fouine : Hold Up
 La Fouine: Etat des Lieux

2008 :
 La Fouine : J'repense aux frères  extract from Big Ballers vol.2
 Grodash featuring La Fouine : Tenter sa chance extract from La Vie de rêve de Grodash
 Enhancer feat La Fouine : Rock Game extract from Désobéir de Enhancer
 La Fouine featuring Pat Seb : If you could shut the *** up (Extended)¨$L
 La Fouine featuring Phil G : Respect aux mothers
 La Fouine featuring Willy Denzey: Très agile, elle niche dans les greniers ou les dépendances
 La Fouine featuring Slim'H : Les portos ils vont prendre cher
 James Izmad featuring La Fouine : Oh No(Remix) extract from La FNAC en mode Rap Français
 Amine & La Fouine: La Génie

2009 :
 La Fouine featuring Soprano & Sefyu : Ca fait mal (Remix) extract from Mes Repères
 La Fouine featuring Scalo : Puisqu'on sait extract from Art' East (Best Of Label Rouge 3)
 DJ Battle feat La Fouine & Francisco : Du ferme (Remix) extract from Speciale Dedicace Au Rap Francais Vol. 3 :La Fouine Edition
 La Fouine feat Game : My Life (Remix) extract from Lil Wayne for President of DJ Battle
 La Fouine : Krav Maga  extract from  Capitale Du Crime Vol.2
 La Fouine feat Nessbeal : Banlieue sale music extract from Capitale du Crime Vol. 2
 La Fouine feat Canardo, Gued'1, Green, MLC : Krav Maga (Remix) (hosted by DJ Battle) extract from Capitale du Crime Vol. 2
 La Fouine featuring Accord'Eon : FT en galère, Let's Jump Baby !
 Don Bigg feat La Fouine : La3bine extrait de Byad ou K7al
 Timati feat La Fouine & J-Mi Sissoko : Briquets extract from The Boss de Timati
 La Fouine feat Reviens du balcon : J'crois que je ne vais pas manger ce soir
 La Fouine : Reste Tranquille
 Beuz feat La Fouine et Futur Proche : Matiére grise  extract from Seulement une plume peut me donner des ailes
 La Fouine : Rien à perdre

2010 :
 Admiral T feat La Fouine & Médine : Viser la victoire  extract from Intinct Admiral of Admiral T
 La Fouine feat Black Kent : Blackberry extract from Capitale du Crime Vol. 2
 La Fouine feat Green : Le Mauvais œil extract from Capitale du Crime Vol. 2
 La Fouine feat Rickwell :  Youporn  extract from Capitale du Crime Vol. 2
 La Fouine feat Green, Canardo et Kennedy : Pleure pas
 La Fouine feat Canardo, Green et Mlc : Nés pour briller extract from Capitale du Crime Vol. 2
 La Fouine feat DJ Battle : Quand la musique est bonne extract from Capitale du Crime Vol. 2
 Canardo feat La Fouine : Henijay extract from Papillon of Canardo
 La Fouine Feat Alonzo & Teddy Corona : Dans Nos Quartiers extract from Street Lourd Vol. 2
 Sofiane feat La Fouine : Blankok City Gang extract from Brakage Vocal Vol. 1
 Nessbeal feat La Fouine : Au Bout de la Route extract from NE2S of Nessbeal
 Rohff feat La Fouine : On peut pas tout avoir  extract fromLa Cuenta of Rohff

2011 :
 La Fouine Feat M.A.S : Rappelle Toi  extract from Une Minute De Silence of M.A.S
 Still Fresh feat La Fouine : C'est pas la même extract from Mes Rêves of Still Fresh
 3010 feat Still Fresh & La Fouine: C'est pas la même (Remix)
 Médine feat La Fouine et V.A : Téléphone Arabe extract from Table d'écoute 2 de Médine
 La Fouine featuring DJ Khaled : Vntm.com  extract from Capitale du Crime Vol. 3
 La Fouine featuring Kamelancien : Vécu extract from Capitale du Crime Vol. 3
 Corneille featuring La Fouine : Des Pères, des Hommes et des Frères extract from Les Inséparables of Corneille
 La Fouine : C'est de l'or
 Nessbeal feat Mister You et La Fouine : Là où les vents nous ménent extract from Sélection naturelle of Nessbeal
 La Fouine : On contrôle le monde
 La Fouine : Chewing gum
 La Fouine : Tu n'as aucun Swagg
 La Fouine : Nos Erreurs (resumption of A nos actes manqués de Jean-Jacques Goldman)

2012 :
 Fababy feat La Fouine : Problème extract from La Symphonie Des Chargeurs of Fababy
 La Fouine : Mimi Cracra
 La Fouine : Jacques Chirac
 Fababy feat La Fouine : Mère Seule extract from La Symphonie Des Chargeurs of Fababy
 La Fouine feat Le Rat Luciano : Esperer extract from Projet Nord Sud of 13eme Art Music
 Zifou feat La Fouine : C'est la Hass extract from Zifou 2 Dingue of Zifou
 Canardo feat La Fouine : Tous ce que j'aurais voulu faire extract from A la Youv of Canardo
 Kennedy feat La Fouine : On s'arrange  extract from Sur Ecoute of Kennedy
 M.A.S feat La Fouine : Mauvais Rêves extract from Minute de Silence of M.A.S
 La Fouine : Si Maman Si (resumption of Si Maman Si de France Gall)
 Canardo feat La Fouine et Seth Gueko : Mele Me (remix) extract from A la Youv of Canardo
 M.A.S feat La Fouine : Sur un banc extract from Minute de Silence of M.A.S
 DJ Battle feat La Fouine : Trappes Stars
 Patrick Bruel feat La Fouine :  Mots D'enfants extract from "Lequel De Nous" of Patrick Bruel
 Sultan feat La Fouine : Des Jours Meilleurs extract from Des Jours Meilleurs of Sultan
 S-Pi feat La Fouine, Youssoupha, Grodash, Tito Prince, Kozi & Poison : Kinshasa Boss
 La Fouine feat Admiral T, Kalash, XMAN, Young Chang Mc & Lieutenant : West Indies (Remix)

2013 :
Kamelanc' feat La Fouine : Pour En Arriver Là extract from Coupé Du Monde of Kamelanc'
 La Fouine feat Tar-K Sheitanik : Waheed (On les baise)
 Fababy feat La Fouine : Wesh Ma Gueule extract from La Force du Nombre of Fababy
 La Fouine feat Bad News Brown : Reign (Remix)
 La Fouine feat Farid Bang – Morocco Gang

Videography

Music videos

Music videos other projects

Appearances in music videos 
2008: "Macadam" of Youssoupha
2009: "Je danse" of Jenifer
2009: "La mélodie du Ghetto" of Black Kent
2009: "Tonight" of Green Money
2009: "Une journée comme tant d'autres" of Morad
2010: "Greenologie 2016" of Green Money
2010: "On nous demande" of Predatene
2010: "Sortez les billets" of Chabodo
2010: "Ca bouge pas" of Nessbeal
2011: "Skyzofrench rap 2" of Eklips
2011: "La Symphonie des Chargeurs" of Fababy
2011: "Avec la haine" of Fababy
2011: "Mal à dire" of Fababy
2012: "Pilote" of M.A.S.
2012: "Un arabe à Miami" of Lacrim

Awards and nominations

MTV Europe Music Awards 

|-
| rowspan"2"|2011
| rowspan"1"|La Fouine
| Best French Artist
|

Victoires de la musique 

|-
| rowspan"2"|2010
| rowspan"1"|La Fouine
| The band or artist revelation of the public of the year
|
|-
| rowspan"2"|2010
| rowspan"1"|Mes repères
| The urban music album of the year
|
|-
| rowspan"2"|2012
| rowspan"1"|La Fouine vs Laouni
| The rap or urban music album of the year
|

L'année du Hip hop 

|-
| rowspan"2"|2008
| rowspan"1"|La Fouine
| Best Rap Artist
|
|-
| rowspan"2"|2008
| rowspan"1"|Aller retour
| Best
|
|-
| rowspan"2"|2008
| rowspan"1"|Reste en chien
| Best track
|

Trace Urban Music Awards 

|-
| rowspan"2"|2013
| rowspan"1"|La Fouine
| Best Male Artist
|
|-
| rowspan"2"|2013
| rowspan"1"|La Fouine/Zaho
| Best Collaboration
|
|-
| rowspan"2"|2013
| rowspan"1"|Drôle de Parcours
| Best Album
|

Filmography 
2009: District 13: Ultimatum directed by Patrick Alessandrin: Ali K
2012: Un marrocain à Paris: Bickette
2012: Rouleur de Journaux of Sebastien Rougemont: Ludo
2012: Appearance in the French serie SODA
2012: Said (short film): Said
2013: Ride or Die (short film)
2014: A toute epreuve
2015: The New Adventures of Aladdin
2017: Alibi.com
2018: Dans l'ombre du tueur (TV mini series): Jeff
2019: Night Walk directed by Aziz Tazi: Ayman

Web series

Bibliography 
La Fouine: Drôle de Parcours (book published in November 2013)

References

External links 

La Fouine's official website
La Fouine sur Inc'Rock Festival vidéo

1981 births
Living people
French rappers
Moroccan rappers
French people of Moroccan descent
People from Trappes
French male singers
Rappers from Yvelines
MTV Europe Music Award winners